Yitzhak (also "Itzhak") Hatuel (born 15 September 1962) is an Israeli fencer. He competed in the individual foil event at the 1984 Summer Olympics at 21 years of age. In Round 1, he went 5-0, defeating Saul Mendoza of Bolivia, Jerome Ko of Hong Kong, Sergio Turiace of Argentina, Nobuyuki Azuma of Japan, and future gold medalist Philippe Omnès of France. In the quarter-finals, he went 2-2, defeating Bilal Rifaat of Egypt and Yu Yifeng of China. In the semi-finals, he went 3-2, defeating Bill Gosbee of Great Britain, Nobuyuki Azuma of Japan, and Mauro Numa of Italy -- who ended up winning the gold medal. In the finals, he went 0-2, losing to Numa and to Peter Lewison of the United States.

He is the brother of Israeli Olympic fencer Lydia Hatuel-Czuckermann (winner of 16 Israeli championships and participant in three Olympic Games), and uncle of Israeli Olympic fencer Delila Hatuel and Israeli fencer Maor Hatuel.

References

External links
 

1962 births
Living people
Israeli male foil fencers
Olympic fencers of Israel
Fencers at the 1984 Summer Olympics
20th-century Israeli people